Lieutenant General Sir George Sinclair Cole  (12 March 1911 – 2 March 1973) was a senior British Army officer who achieved high office in the 1960s.

Early life and education
Cole was born in Croydon, Surrey, the son of Captain Audry Valentine Cole (born Witkowsky) and Dorothea Mary Sinclair Carolin. His grandfather, Leopold Witkowsky (later Cole), a civil servant of the Indian Civil Service, was born in Chicago to Polish parents. He was educated at Wellington College and the Royal Military Academy, Woolwich.

Military career
George Cole was Commissioned into the Royal Artillery on 27 August 1931.

Cole served in the Second World War as a member of the British Expeditionary Force deployed to France in 1939 and then as a General Staff Officer in Military Operations at the War Office from 1943. He became Commanding Officer of 58th Light Anti Aircraft Regiment, Royal Artillery within 21st Army Group in 1945.

After the war he was appointed Military Assistant to the Chief of the Imperial General Staff in 1946 and Military Assistant to the Chairman of Western Europe Commanders-in-Chief in 1949. He went to the Joint Services Staff College in 1950 after which he became Deputy Chief of Staff, Allied Land Forces, Central Europe in 1950. He was then made Head of the Exercise Planning Staff at Supreme Headquarters Allied Powers Europe in 1951.

He went to the Imperial Defence College in 1953 and then became Commanding Officer of 40th Field Regiment, Royal Artillery in Egypt and Cyprus from 1954 to 1955. He was Commander Royal Artillery for 1st Infantry Division from 1956 to 1959 when he became Secretary of the Chiefs of Staff Committee. He was appointed Director of Staff Duties at the War Office in 1961 and General Officer Commanding-in-Chief for Eastern Command in 1965. He went on to be Vice-Chief of the Defence Staff in 1966: he retired in 1967.

He was a keen golfer. After his death, Lt.-Gen. Sir John Cowley, his housemate at Wellington, wrote to The Times:

References

 

|-

1911 births
1973 deaths
Military personnel from Surrey
British people of Polish descent
People from Croydon
British Army lieutenant generals
British Army personnel of World War II
Commanders of the Order of the British Empire
Knights Commander of the Order of the Bath
Royal Artillery officers
People educated at Wellington College, Berkshire
Graduates of the Royal Military Academy, Woolwich
Graduates of the Royal College of Defence Studies